Joseph Ackroyd (November 23, 1847 in Little Falls, Herkimer County, New York – March 15, 1915 in Utica, Oneida County, New York) was an American politician from New York.

Life
He attended the common schools in New York Mills, and Whitestown Seminary and Business College. Then he became a grocer. He married Adelaide Hoag (1848–1936), and they had two children.

Ackroyd was Supervisor of the Town of Whitestown in 1882; and a member of the New York State Assembly (Oneida Co., 2nd D.) in 1884.

He was a member of the New York State Senate (36th D.) in 1907 and 1908.

He died suddenly on March 15, 1915, at his home in Utica, "while reading a newspaper"; and was buried at the Glenside Cemetery in New York Mills.

Sources
 Official New York from Cleveland to Hughes by Charles Elliott Fitch (Hurd Publishing Co., New York and Buffalo, 1911, Vol. IV; pg. 317 and 366)
 Biographical sketches of the members of the Legislature in The Evening Journal Almanac (1884)
 Ex-State Senator Joseph Ackroyd in NYT on March 16, 1915

External links

1847 births
1915 deaths
Democratic Party New York (state) state senators
Politicians from Utica, New York
Democratic Party members of the New York State Assembly
Town supervisors in New York (state)
People from Little Falls, New York
19th-century American politicians